Geertruida Everdina Wilhelmina van Aalten (August 2, 1910 – June 27, 1999) was a Dutch actress who appeared in many German films in the 1920s and 1930s.

Biography

Early life
van Aalten was born on August 2, 1910, in Arnhem in family of a pharmacist. 
Truus found a job with a milliner after school, then trained as a salesgirl at a fashion store in Amsterdam. She passionately wanted to be a movie actress, but very few films were made in the Netherlands at the time.

Early career with Ufa
In 1926, Truus entered a beauty competition in a Dutch magazine - if she won she'd have the chance to audition for a part in a real movie in Berlin. Not long after, she was summoned to the German capital for an audition - along with two hundred other girls. Truus had never had an acting lesson in her life, and was certain she'd be sent home at once One after the other, the girls were filmed. They were all older than Truus, and she could see she hadn't a hope.

When the director watched the tests, one girl stood out - where everyone else had gazed into the lens with expressions of the deepest sincerity, this one hadn't been able to repress a laugh. She was funny, it shone through, and she got the job.

Like its counterparts in California, Rome and New York, Ufa was a factory - scripts were being written, scenes were being shot in big, barn-like studios, editors assembled printed footage in cuttingrooms. There were plasterers' workshops, carpentry shops, prop stores, hair and wardrobe departments, and publicity offices planning the release of completed movies (Ufa ran 3,000 cinemas, admitting nearly a million people a day). Truus met the other members of the cast - her six "sisters" (including English actress Betty Balfour) and Willy Fritsch as Count Horkay. Fritsch was very well known and handsome, and Truus fell in love with him on the spot.

Truus had to quickly get used to being made up and going through wardrobe, then finding her place on the sets. She watched cameraman Carl Hoffmann (who had lit big hits like Dr. Mabuse the Gambler and Die Nibelungen) and all the grips, riggers, plasterers, cable bashers, and set dressers bustling about their jobs. She learned that acting didn't just mean showing emotions and moving about, but demanded that she concentrate on staying within chalk marks on the floor so as not to stray outside the range of the lights or the camera's focus. Despite it all (and perhaps because of one particular scene in which Willy Fritsch kissed her), Truus loved the work.

Ufa bigwigs made a decision. Truus's German was wobbly at best, but she was sparkly and funny and the camera liked her. If her father would sign a contract, Ufa would train Truus and put her in more films. Her future would depend on hard work and luck. Truus and her father talked it over. Being an actress wasn't a secure job - it wasn't even a well-respected job - but it was all she'd ever wanted to do. The contract was signed and Truus moved to Berlin.

At Ufa Truus was introduced to a major figure in her life, highly respected actress Olga Tschechowa, who became her unofficial mentor and mother-figure in movieland. Olga was a fascinating woman, born in exotic Transcaucasia, part of the Russian Empire. Her claim to be related to Anton Chekhov was true, but she also loved to spin the most amazing yarns about her early life: she was close to Tsar Nicholas II, had met Rasputin and had fled the Revolution disguised as a mute peasant woman, hiding her jewellery in her mouth. She'd been acting since 1917, and had become one of Germany's most popular stars. Truus adored Olga, later citing her as a major influence both personally and professionally. Nicknaming her "Trulala", Olga taught her the disciplines of movie work and encouraged her to be more serious in her approach to it. She also badgered the still-chubby girl to lose some of her 106 pounds. "Have you done any exercises yet today, Trulala?" she would cry. "Which ones? For how long? Go get a copy of 'Eat Well And Stay Healthy' - we can't use fat girls in films!"

Ufa put Truus into her next film, His Late Excellency in 1927. It starred Willy Fritsch, Max Hansen and Olga Tschechowa, and was directed by William Thiele.

In preparation for the premiere of A Sister of Six, Truus had a dress made specially. It's possible that the more sophisticated ladies present may have thought that in a dress so decorated and with so many colours in it, she looked rather like an over-decorated birthday cake, but Truus was delighted with it. She sat in her box, trembling with nerves as the lights went down, waiting for her scenes to appear. What nobody had told her was that the film had been edited severely to get it to length - her scenes had been shortened or cut altogether. Soon she was grateful that nobody could see her in the dark as she hid at the back of her box, crying all over her beautiful new dress. When the credits ran at the end, her name wasn't even mentioned - but this was the new, tough Truus van Aalten, not the kid from Arnhem any more. She decided to stay in Berlin and make a career as an actress. Ufa continued to employ her for the following year, after which she worked for various other film companies.

Silent films were genuinely international. While today's Hollywood movies are typically dubbed straight into German, French, Russian and Spanish, films were originally adapted much more closely to different countries' tastes. Reading intertitles specially written for them, an audience in Florence or Heraklion or Omsk could enjoy a story about people with local names (John became Hans or Jan or Ioan or any other name that suited his character better - if a fat man was funnier coming from Düsseldorf rather than Dortmund, then that's where he came from). Local jokes and references were built into the dialogue, and audiences welcomed foreign actors into their lives with far greater affection than later when the movies became talkies. Truus was funny, pretty, spunky - and audiences across Europe were destined to love her.

The next year brought more film parts. She benefitted hugely from all this experience - particularly in dealing with directors, who played a particularly powerful rôle in German moviemaking. One problem she did occasionally encounter from older actors was a certain snobbishness about her non-theatrical origin: a "real" actress had stage training.

German film companies tended to draw from a fairly small pool of actors and actresses. A trusted performer moved from production to production, and being welcomed into this movie village meant that Truus could anticipate the same security - as long as she worked hard and didn't do anything to turn the public against her.

Truus learned about the machinery of being a movie starlet - she posed for photos and gave interviews for film magazines. She even found herself being asked to appear in advertisements, and earned a surprising amount of money endorsing Bubisan hair products and Marylan face cream.

The "Truus" style

Truus had a distinctive look - her mixture of boyish yet feminine energy was very 1920s. Her sharply bobbed hair and uninhibited style owed a lot to American comic actress Colleen Moore, who'd appeared in her first film in 1916. Seven years later, trapped in "little girl" roles, Moore had sought a way out of the long dresses and demure ringlets that she knew no longer represented young American women. When she'd read the scandalous modern novel Flaming Youth, then learned that it was to be filmed, she'd seen that the lead part could be her route to stardom. "I begged for the role," she remembered in her autobiography, "but the New York office said I wasn't the type, I was better in costume parts. I was frantic for fear they'd give the part to someone else." It was Colleen's mother who'd had the inspiration: "She said, 'Why don't we cut your hair?' I was elated. She picked up the scissors and, whack, off came the long curls. I felt as if I'd been emancipated. Then she trimmed my hair around with bangs like a Japanese girl's haircut. Five days later I had the part."

Moore wasn't the first girl to bob her hair, but doing so was still quite shocking for most people. Flaming Youth was a hit around the world, and women in their millions started queuing at barber shops for Colleen Moore bobs.

Silent films
Truus' next films built up her experience and slowly added to her fanbase. The funny Dutch girl was attracting attention that could easily have dissipated had her "Girl Wins Film Competition" fame not been backed up by talent and hard work. In quick succession, Truus worked on Six Girls and a Room for the Night, When the Guard Marches, Leontine's Husbands, The Happy Vagabonds and A Modern Casanova, all released in 1928.

Comedy was definitely what Truus did best - and she was a bright spark in often uninspired films. German audiences loved to laugh, and almost a quarter of all films made in Germany were comedies.

The film-making community adored her, and referred to her affectionately as "die kleine Hollandische Käse" (The Little Dutch Cheese). A 1927 article about her in the Dutch weerkly magazine "Het Leven" ("Life") described her as a "spirited, comical talent who's winning all hearts in Germany". It went on: "She's a young thing who's passionately wrapped up in film, and she's chasing round the Ufa lot in the Kochstrasse like a real rascal, making it a dangerous place with her tricks and happy laughter".

For Truus, 1929 brought I Lost My Heart on a Bus, Jenny's Stroll Through Men and Gentlemen Among Themselves.

Also in 1929, The Eccentric gave her the chance to work with one of Germany's comedy giants, Karl Valentin. A superb visual clown, Valentin made the most of his gangling frame, creating agonizing scenes where the most dreadful violence would happen - usually to himself. He wrote and produced many influential comedies, and was revered for transcending the uninspired slapstick that plagued German comedies. Valentin, a hypochondriac, wasn't always easy to work with, but he gave Truus third billing after Liesl Karlstadt, his longterm working partner - a real indication of the respect Valentin felt she warranted.

Talkies
Van Aalten's 1930 film O Mädchen, mein Mädchen, wie lieb' ich Dich! ("Oh Girlie, My Girlie, How I Love You!") was to be one of Germany's last silent films, but she successfully made the transition to talking pictures. The public didn't hold her Dutch accent against her and she (unlike a number of her contemporaries) continued to work. She was becoming well known now - film magazines featured articles about "das Mädchen aus Holland" (that girl from Holland), the huge publisher Ross Verlag (and others) issued postcards of her in various moviestar poses, and tobacco companies used her face on collectors' album cards.

Truus was a particular favourite in the Netherlands, where she was hailed as the local girl who'd become a film star. They called her Truusje ("Truusie"), an affectionate form of her name. She wasn't just popular in Europe, either - she was building a following across the Atlantic too. German-language cinemas in New York and many other cities showed all the big German movies, though sometimes a couple of years after their European releases.

Truus' 1930 film Susanne macht Ordnung ("Susanne Cleans Up") proved very popular both in Germany and in America. For the first time, Truus got top billing for her part as Susanne Braun, a 17-year-old orphan attending a Swiss boarding school, where she's been living since she was little. She meets Robert, a young man on holiday from Berlin, and they fall in love. His questions about her family embarrass her - she believes that her mysterious father is still alive. Helped by another girl, she scrapes together enough money to set off to Berlin to look for him. As the film progresses she finds several possible fathers, and greets each one with "Hello, Papa!", causing huge confusion and breaking up his marriage. The film, a musical comedy, was reviewed by the New York Times in October 1931: "With the arrival at the Belmont of Truus von (sic) Aalten, as the stellar performer in Susanne Macht Ordnung, those understanding German will have an opportunity of enjoying the work of an excellent young screen actress," the reviewer wrote, adding that Truus was "alert and interesting" in her role. "The banking concern of which Susanne's father is a member is in distress, and can be saved only through his marriage to the adipose sister of the firm's heaviest creditor. He is about to consent to the marriage, when Susanne's arrival causes great confusion. It seems impossible for her to ascertain who is her father and finally she gives up the investigation, refusing the protection of the man who really is her father. But all is not lost, for Robert, who has had his own troubles trying to find Susanne in Berlin, encounters her eventually and all is well."

1930 was a busy year - other films in which Truus appeared were Headfirst into Happiness and Darling of the Gods, which was produced by Ufa's top producer, Erich Pommer, a man dedicated to creativity and innovation. The film starred the imposing Emil Jannings, who'd just completed The Blue Angel with Marlene Dietrich. World-famous (he'd won the first-ever Oscar). What Jannings thought of Truus - who played most of her rôle dressed as a ballet dancer in a very fetching little white tutu - isn't recorded. Also in the film, as the wonderfully named Olga von Dagomirska, was Truus' old friend Olga Tschechowa.

Truus' German had improved by now - one interviewer quipped that "she occasionally mixes up 'mir' and 'mich', but felt that this was excusable since "that happens to even the best linguists!".

By 1931, Truus was living in her own fourth-floor apartment in Berlin's Königin-Augusta-Straße, overlooking a canal - a nice reminder of the Netherlands. Her friends called her flat "The Nursery" - a cosy, ribbon-strewn, white-painted place with posters on the walls, shared with Pucki (her Airedale terrier), Didi (a Maltese dog) and a Cyprian cat (whose name has not survived). Visitors were greeted with loud barking, hearty mewing and the occasional bloodcurdling squawk from her parrot (donated by a family in Indonesia). Juliana was now rather battered, but was loved none the less and was displayed prominently in her own bed. Other dolls, teddies and Bonzo Dogs occupied various shelves and occasionally invaded the sofa. Also among Truus' prized possessions were a gramophone and a glass cabinet filled with souvenirs from the Netherlands - porcelain, little sabots and ornaments.

One of her jobs on days when she wasn't shooting was to answer the piles of letters she received asking for autographs. This was an expensive sideline (she had to buy the postcards and stamps herself), but she enjoyed hearing from people all over the world, and knew that it was a vital part of building up her fanbase.

Through the years, Truus' greatest idol had been Charlie Chaplin. Simple comedy was easy - banana peels, fat ladies, funny dogs - all the clichés of slapstick had been done to death, but what Chaplin was doing was different. His latest picture, City Lights summed it up: its characters and situations somehow caused an audience to care about the people on the screen. Yes, the story of a tramp who loved a blind flower-girl was sentimental and old-fashioned, but the film wove a powerful spell over audiences, and they left the cinemas exhausted from an emotional rollercoaster. Truus determined to seek out more dramatic roles - playing dizzy teenagers wasn't enough - she wanted to speak to an audience's emotions like Chaplin did.

The New York Times for October 14, 1933 reviewed Truus' film The Beggar Student, then showing at the 79th St Theatre. The movie, it said, had "a certain amount of charm", but didn't measure up to other operetta films of its type. Truus, the reviewer said, was "excellent in her leading comedy rôle".

1933: Rise of Nazism
Now Truus found herself in an industry where the most creative people were fearful for their livelihoods - not to mention their lives. Writers, producers, directors, art directors, composers and actors didn't have to be Jewish or homosexual to fear the 3 am knock on the door - just being artistic and outspoken was enough to attract suspicion and surveillance by the police.

That same year, Truus worked for director Georg Jacoby again - twice - first on an Ufa short film called Eine Ideale Wohnung ("An Ideal Flat"), and then on his Tales from the Vienna Woods. Shot in Austria, this was a musical with tunes by Johann Strauss. Musicals were extremely popular, and Viennese operettas could always find an enthusiastic German audience. The Nazi government didn't encourage the production of propaganda movies - they knew that the public would best be reassured by comfy subjects.

The New York Times called Tales from the Vienna Woods "a tasty mélange of comedy and music", and mentioned "the little Dutch actress". There weren't many Dutch film stars - the only other one was Lien Deyers, born in Amsterdam, three months younger than Truus. She'd been working steadily since 1927, when an act of supreme cheek had endeared her to Fritz Lang himself. Living in Vienna with her actress mother, she'd attended a teaparty, knowing that the director of Die Nibelungen and Dr. Mabuse would be there. Spotting the Great Man and picking a moment when the crowds around him thinned, she approached him and asked (in not-very-good German), "Herr Lang - wouldn't you like to discover me?". Lang screwed in his monocle and surveyed this blonde, self-assured girl. By coincidence his upcoming film, Spione (Spies) had a part for a girl like her. Movies were silent, so her voice was unimportant... The film did good business, the public liked her, and she was soon in great demand, even coping well with the arrival of sound. She married producer Alfred Zeisler (who'd overseen production on Truus' film Sajenko the Soviet) and obviously had a great future ahead of her.

1934 saw Truus in the Netherlands, starring in her only film in Dutch, Het Meisje met den Blauwen Hoed ("The Girl In The Blue Hat"). The Netherlands' film industry was thriving - the rise of the talkie had increased local demand for Dutch films. The film did well - Dutch cinemagoers were delighted to see Truus in a Dutch film at last, and responded well to her obvious skill and experience as a screen comedian.

It wasn't until 1939, that Truus was offered another film part. Hitler's Germany had few places for female actors not prepared to play adoring sweethearts or fruitful mothers, and even fewer for non-Aryan girls. She played the widow Anni, a good part in Ein ganzer Kerl ("A Regular Chap"). Truus didn't know it, but her film career was now over.

Return to the Netherlands
In the autumn of 1940, Truus returned to live in the Netherlands now under German occupation. Now she found herself being offered film work - to appear in Dutch films controlled and censored by the occupying power. She refused, realising that they only wanted to use her for propaganda - but as she turned the repeated requests down, she knew she was destroying any hope of rekindling her movie career.

On June 6, 1944, word spread that British and American troops had landed in great force in Normandy. The Allies worked their way slowly up the country, and that September they fought a huge battle at the bridge over the Rhine at Arnhem, Truus' birthplace. On May 5 the Germans in the Netherlands surrendered to the Allies. Three days later the German Wehrmacht and the rump Nazi government in Flensburg signed the complete and unconditional capitulation and surrendered to the allies all over Europe.

For Truus, the movie industry as she had known it was dead. Berlin was divided, surrounded by the Soviets and kept in essential supplies only by the Allied Airlift. Ufa was gone, and many of the people with whom she had worked were simply gone. Worse than that, it was in the Allies' interest to squash German film-making, mainly to guarantee a market for their own movies.

Truus tried to find acting work in the Netherlands, then in England, but in the depressed atmosphere of post-war Britain, nobody was interested in an unknown actress with a foreign accent. Perhaps her lack of English was one reason she had not tried to get to Hollywood, where so many of her contemporaries had found work. Truus never acted again.

Later life
1954 found Truus in Voorhout, a town in the western Netherlands, setting up what was to become a successful business importing and exporting souvenirs and promotional items. Film Stardom was a long way behind her now, but she was still doing better (though she didn't know it) than the "other" Dutch film star, cheeky blonde Lien Deyers. She and Alfred Zeisler had reached England, where he had directed a Cary Grant picture.  They'd moved on to Los Angeles where her husband had found employment as a producer, but Lien - even with her history of stardom in Europe, and with such important friends as Marlene Dietrich to help her - couldn't find a job there either. Having tried running a business selling novelties, she'd drifted into alcoholism and multiple divorces. Her life ruined, she spent time in custody for violent behaviour and she died, forgotten, in 1965.

In 1972, Dutch TV transmitted a four-part version of "Het meisje met den blauwen Hoed" ("The Girl In The Blue Hat"), an update of Truus' 1934 film. Watching Jenny Arean play Betsy must have been a strange experience for Truus, whose film career was now almost totally forgotten by the general public. As the years passed, textbooks on German film like "The BFI Companion to German Cinema", "Das gab's nur einmal" and "The German Cinema Book" simply left her out.

A 1987 book by European culture expert Kathinka Dittrich, "Achter het doek" ("Behind The Screen"), brought the story of Dutch movie history of the 1920s and 1930s back to public knowledge. Forty years after her career had been destroyed, Truus found that people were beginning to recognise her for what she'd been - a movie star who'd brought pleasure to millions.

Truus' old age was marred by bouts of mental illness, and she spent her last two years at a psychiatric clinic in the village of Warmond, where she died on the 27th of June 1999, aged 88.

Very few of Truus van Aalten's films have ever been released for home viewing. One possible reason is that the Russian Army seized the Ufa studios in April 1945 and appropriated the contents - including copies of a huge number of German films that have never been seen since.

Filmography

References

External links

truusvanaalten.com - a website devoted entirely to Truus van Aalten

1910 births
1999 deaths
Dutch actresses
Dutch film actresses
Dutch silent film actresses
People from Arnhem
20th-century Dutch actresses
Dutch expatriates in Germany